, provisional designation: , is a Jupiter trojan from the Greek camp, approximately  in diameter. It was discovered on 10 November 1998, by astronomers with the LINEAR survey at the Lincoln Laboratory's Experimental Test Site near Socorro, New Mexico, in the United States. The dark Jovian asteroid belongs to the 110 largest Jupiter trojans and shows an exceptionally slow rotation of 562 hours. It has not been named since its numbering in April 2001.

Orbit and classification 

 is a dark Jupiter trojan in a 1:1 orbital resonance with Jupiter. It is located in the leading Greek camp at the Gas Giant's  Lagrangian point, 60° ahead of its orbit . It is also a non-family asteroid in the Jovian background population. It orbits the Sun at a distance of 4.7–5.7 AU once every 12 years (4,370 days; semi-major axis of 5.23 AU). Its orbit has an eccentricity of 0.10 and an inclination of 25° with respect to the ecliptic.

Numbering and naming 

This minor planet was numbered by the Minor Planet Center on 8 April 2001. , it has not been named.

Physical characteristics 

 is an assumed, carbonaceous C-type asteroid. Most Jupiter trojans are D-types, with the reminder being mostly C and P-type asteroids. It has a typical V–I color index of 0.99 and a BR-color of 1.15.

Rotation period 

With a rotation period of 562 hours, this slow rotator belongs to the Top 100 slowest rotators known to exist. It is also the third-slowest rotator among the larger Jupiter trojans after 4902 Thessandrus (738 hours) and (7352) 1994 CO (648 hours).
 
Lightcurve analysis gave an exceptionally long period of  hours with a brightness amplitude of 0.45 magnitude, somewhat indicative of a non-spherical shape. A second, lower-rated lightcurve from Kepler gave an alternative, even longer period of  hours.

These results supersede a poor period determination made at the Sierra Nevada Observatory in 2007, which gave a period 12.080 hours.

Diameter and albedo 

According to the survey carried out by the NEOWISE mission of NASA's Wide-field Infrared Survey Explorer and the Japanese Akari satellite,  measures 46.00 and 47.91 kilometers in diameter and its surface has an albedo between 0.076 and 0.084, respectively. The Collaborative Asteroid Lightcurve Link assumes a standard albedo for a carbonaceous asteroid of 0.057 and calculates a larger diameter of 50.77 kilometers based on an absolute magnitude of 10.2.

References

External links 
 Asteroid Lightcurve Database (LCDB), query form (info )
 Discovery Circumstances: Numbered Minor Planets (20001)-(25000) – Minor Planet Center
 Asteroid (23958) 1998 VD30 at the Small Bodies Data Ferret
 
 

023958
023958
023958
19981110